Kaarlo Olavi Väkevä (2 March 1909 – 27 March 1932) was a Finnish boxer who competed in the 1928 Summer Olympics.

He was born in Jakobstad and died in Aalborg, Denmark.

In 1928, he was eliminated in the quarterfinals of the featherweight class after losing to the eventual bronze medalist Harold Devine.

Winning a bronze medal at the 1930 European Amateur Boxing Championships, he became the first Finn to do so.

1928 Olympic results
Below is the record of Kaarlo Väkevä, a Finnish featherweight boxer who competed at the 1928 Amsterdam Olympics:

 Round of 32: bye
 Round of 16: defeated Raul Talan (Mexico) on points
 Quarterfinal: lost to Harold Devine (United States) on points

References

External links
profile

1909 births
1932 deaths
People from Jakobstad
Featherweight boxers
Olympic boxers of Finland
Boxers at the 1928 Summer Olympics
Finnish male boxers
Sportspeople from Ostrobothnia (region)